Lepidophyma occulor,  the Japlan tropical night lizard, is a species of lizard in the family Xantusiidae. It is a small lizard found in Mexico. This species is native to the Valle de Jalpan in the Sierra Madre Oriental of northern Querétaro and adjacent San Luis Potosí states, from 900 to 1,400 meters elevation.

References

Lepidophyma
Endemic reptiles of Mexico
Fauna of the Sierra Madre Oriental
Reptiles described in 1942
Taxa named by Hobart Muir Smith